Nahuel Huapi National Park is the oldest national park in Argentina, established in 1934. It surrounds Nahuel Huapi Lake in the foothills of the Patagonian Andes. Its landscapes represent the north Patagonian Andean Zone consisting of three types, namely, the Altoandino (with perpetual snow above an altitude of ), the Andino-Patagónico (in the lower reaches of the hills) and the Patagonian steppe. It also represents small parts of the Valdivian Rainforest.

The park is completely protected while the reserve is partially protected. The national park is dominated by the high mountain chain of the Andes, many lakes, rapid rivers, waterfalls, snow-clad peaks, glaciers and extensive forests. It is bordered by Chile on its western side.

Etymology
The park derives its name from the lake which it surrounds, namely the "Nahuel Huapi". In the Mapuche language, Nahuel means "jaguar", and Huapi means "island".

History
The earliest discovery of Nahuel Huapi by the non-indigenous peoples is linked to the conquest of Chile. In the summer of 1552–1553, the Governor of Chile Pedro de Valdivia sent Francisco de Villagra to explore the area east of the Andes at the latitudes of the city of Valdivia. Francisco de Villagra crossed the Andes through Mamuil Malal Pass and headed south until reaching Limay River in the vicinity of Nahuel Huapi Lake.

In colonial times explorers in the search for the legendary "Ciudad de Los Cesares" visited the zone and Jesuit missionaries coming from Chiloé Archipelago established a precarious mission on the shores of the lake. Quinoa is known to have been cultivated near the shores of the lake during this period.

In the 1870s and 1880s Perito Moreno undertook a series of exploration trips into Patagonia.  Later he worked for the Argentine government's boundary commission. In short —Perito Morenos‘ explorations and work were fundamental for securing Argentine sovereignty of the Nahuel Huapi area. As compensation for his services Perito Moreno was granted a huge tract of land around Nahuel Huapi Lake.

In 1903, Perito Moreno donated  of land in the area to the federal government. At the same time he proposed the creation of a national park. A decree of February 1, 1909 recognized that the area needed protection then in 1916 works begun to establish a park and it finally opened in 1922 as Parque Nacional del Sur. The total surface of the incipient national park in 1916 surpassed that of the donations of Perito Moreno. It was not until October 9, 1934 that Nahuel Huapi National Park acquired it present name. At the same time in 1934 the Iguazú National Park was established in Argentina.

In contrast to subtropical Iguazú National Park, however, temperate Nahuel Huapi National Park was believed to be able to compete with the tourism of Europe and was therefore, along with Bariloche, prioritized by national tourism development planners. In the first year of the National Park Service, 1935, several regulations were implemented that affected Nahuel Huapi. These included construction code, sport fishing, standardization of drinking water sanitation, and issuance of vendor permits. The area opened up for mountain climbing and other recreational activities after the park was established.

Geography

It is located in the southwest section of the Neuquén and northwest section of the Río Negro provinces, bordering with Chile. The park has two zones: the park and the natural reserve with development concentrated in the reserve. The largest city and a base for tourism is San Carlos de Bariloche, which is surrounded by the park. San Carlos de Bariloche is the main hub when visiting the lake, and is known as the "Gateway to Patagonia", the "Chocolate Capital" and the "Honeymoon Capital" of Argentina. However, the city and other settlements are zoned outside the limits of the park. A further subzoning into the north, south and southern zones has been implemented with an exclusive recreational area named the Cerro Cathedral. Villa La Angostura is another lakeside resort also within the boundaries of the park.

The area is known as the Argentine Lake District, as there are many lakes in the park, including Nahuel Huapi, Mascardi, Gutiérrez, Traful, Guillelmo, Fonck and Perito Moreno Lakes. Cerro Catedral is a  peak within the park and an important ski resort. Bordering the park to the north is the Lanín National Park.

Geology
Geological formations in  the park and the reserve are generally tertiary rocks of volcanic origin coupled with andesites and porphyrys. The cliffs of the San Pedro Peninsula depict eroded glacial features and the lakes also show many glacial effects.

Climate
The park has a cold temperate climate. Winters are cold and rainy with frequent snowfalls. Mean temperatures range between  during winter.

Lake Nahuel Huapi 

The lake was explored by the Jesuit priest Nicolás Mascardi in 1670 who also built a chapel on the Huemul Peninsula of the lake. The southern shore of the lake has many hotels and restaurant catering to the tourist industry. The Quetrihué Peninsula in the north of the lake has been set aside as a separate national park, Los Arrayanes National Park. The lake has many islands. The Forest Research station is located on one of them, Victoria Island, which is a natural reserve approachable by boats. Huemul Island hosted the Huemul Project, the Argentinean secret research project on nuclear fusion in 1949–1952.

Bariloche

San Carlos de Bariloche is located on the southern shore of Lake Nahuel Huapi. The town was established in 1902. However, its importance as tourist hub grew after the 1930s when the national park surrounding it was established. It is well known as the "Honeymoon Capital of Argentina", apart from  its fame for its chocolate manufacturing industry. Its  stretch below the Andes mountains is bounded on the south by Lago Mascardi and on the north by the Villa Traful. North of the city the Seven Lakes road provides scenic vistas of landscapes. Glaciers and waterfalls, which are near to the Pampa Linda, are located to the west of Bariloche. It is also the base for mountaineering trips to  Mount Tronador (also known as the Thunderer as ice falling produces such sounds) of extinct volcanic origin.

Plants and animals
The park's ecology consists of Patagonian steppe at lower elevations and Valdivian temperate forests at higher elevations. It is notable for its rich wildlife due to its many biotopes, attributed to the varied altitude and precipitation range.

The dominant species of plankton in the lake is Dictyosphaerium pulchellum.

Plants

Xerophytic Patagonian flora is dominant in the eastern half of the park while the western half is covered profusely with temperate rain forests. The dominant tree species in the park are the lengas, coihue, and the ñires. Other varieties of trees seen in the park are the Chilean cedar (Austrocedrus chilensis), Winter's bark (Drimys winteri),  Myrceugenella apiculata, Lomatia ferruginea, Lomatia hirsuta, Alstroemeria aurantica, Fuchsia megellanica, bamboo Chusquea culcou, Mitraria cocinea and Embothrium coccineum. The alerce or Patagonian cypress is a slow-growing conifer which is also present. Other flora include arrayanes, coihues, ferns, the caña colihue reeds, amancayes and arvejillas. The llao llao fungus has irregular growth patterns on the trees and is a symbol of the area; it is also the name of the Llao Llao Hotel, a famous resort. The Valdivian rain forests is well forested with fine arrayan trees with crumbling bark. In the high rain fall zones close to the Chilean border there is profusion of 450-year-old coihue trees (small leaved evergreen beeches). Fitzroya of 1500 year's age scattered throughout the park. Chusquea canes grows in abundance.

Animals
Animals include river otters (Lontra provocax), southern Andean huemuls (Hippocamelus bisulcus), pudus (small deer), foxes, cougars, guanacos and maras. Huillin (Lontra provocax), an endangered native otter, has been reported in the park. Birds reported include Magellanic woodpeckers, green austral parakeets, geese, ducks, swans, blue-eyed cormorants, Andean condors (Vultur gryphus) and green-backed firecrowns (Saphonoides sephaniodes). Amphibian fauna reported are Hylorina sylvatica and Bufo spinolosus. Five genera and 32 species of Simuliidae (black fly) have been recorded. These genera are Cnesia, Cnesiamima, Gigantodax, Paraustrasimulium, and Simulium (Pternaspatha),  a subgenus of Simulium with 19 species; these account for 57% of the Simuliidae fauna found in Argentina.

Nahuelito is a lake monster named after the Nahuel Huapi Lake as its sighting in the lake is reported widely. Whether it is a fact or fiction, its sighting has been reported by local people and tourists with widely varying descriptions mentioning a “giant water snake with humps and fish-like fins to a swan with a snake's head, the overturned hull of a boat, and the stump of a tree”. Reported widely since the 1920s, predating Nessie and the book titled The Lost World (Arthur Conan Doyle), Nahuelito is described as “an Argentinean media star.”

Recreation

The park offers many avenues for recreation. Particular places of interest in this context are the Tronador, Puerto Blest, Victoria Island and the road to the 7 Lakes. Other options for recreation are available at the Cerro Catedral, Lopez and Punta Negra. Most of the recreation facility revolves around trekking of high mountain and steep hills apart from rafting, skiing in Cerro Catedral, kayaking in Pura Vida, mountain biking, rock-climbing, kite surfing, canopy, paragliding, golf at Llao Llao, trekking on a number of routes, ferry services from Puerto Rias.

Some of the well-developed routes for mountaineering are: The climb to the Thunderer volcano, which has several trails that reach up to the large glaciers; trails to the Tronador (an extinct volcano); the trails that link the San Martin shelter and Manfredo Segre (Black Lagoon); treks to San Martín and Manfredo Segre (Laguna Negra); to Lopez and to the viewpoint of the Stone of Habsburg, the walk of Paso de las Nubes Puerto Frías linking to Pampa Linda; to the valley and the ridge of Mount Rucaco Black Gap; and to Frey and San Martín (Jakob lagoon), which passes by the edge of Cerro Catedral.

References

External links

 Nahuel Huapi National Park official page 

 
National parks of Argentina
Protected areas of Río Negro Province
Protected areas of Neuquén Province
Protected areas established in 1934
Biosphere reserves of Argentina
Valdivian temperate rainforest